Michael Heseltine received numerous honours in recognition of his career in politics. These included:

Life peerage
Following his retirement from the House of Commons of the United Kingdom at the 2001 United Kingdom general election, Heseltine was awarded a life peerage allowing him to sit in the House of Lords. He took the title  Baron Heseltine, of Thenford in the County of Northamptonshire. He sits with the Conservative Party benches.

Commonwealth honours

Other distinctions
  1998 President's Medal from the Chartered Institute of Public Relations.
  1999 Gold Medal from the Institute of Sheet Metal Engineering.

Scholastic

Memberships and Fellowships

Freedom of the City

  13 March 2012: Liverpool.
  13 September 2012: London.

Places named after Heseltine

   Heseltine Institute for Public Policy, Practice and Place at the University of Liverpool.
  The Heseltine Gallery at Chenderit School

References

Heseltine, Michael
Heseltine, Michael